Neurodegeneration with brain iron accumulation  is a heterogenous group of inherited neurodegenerative diseases, still under research, in which iron accumulates in the basal ganglia, either resulting in progressive dystonia, Parkinsonism, spasticity, optic atrophy, retinal degeneration, neuropsychiatric, or diverse neurologic abnormalities.
Some of the NBIA disorders have also been associated with several genes in synapse and lipid metabolism related pathways. NBIA is not one disease but an entire group of disorders, characterized by an accumulation of brain iron, sometimes in the presence of axonal spheroids in the central nervous system.

Iron accumulation can occur anywhere in the brain, with accumulation typically occurring in globus pallidus, substantia nigra, pars reticula, striatum and cerebellar dentate nuclei. Symptoms can include various movement disorders, neuropsychiatric issues, seizures, visual disturbances, and cognitive decline, usually in different combinations. 10-15 genetic NBIA disorders have been identified involved in various cell processes: iron metabolism, coenzyme A biosynthesis, phospholipid metabolism, ceramide metabolism, lysosomal disorders, as well as mutations in genes with unknown functions. Onset can occur at different ages, from early childhood to late adulthood.

There are currently no curative treatments for any of the NBIA disorders, though several medications have been subject to clinical trial including the iron chelator deferiprone.

Variants

Diagnosis
DAT-Scans, TC(D)-Sonography, PET-Scans and in some cases Magnetic resonance imaging (MRI) (type of scans depending on the symptoms) are used to distinguish between the different forms of NBIA due to the accumulation of iron in different areas of the brain. Patients typically fall into two different categories: (1) early onset, rapid progression or (2) late onset, slow progression. The first type is considered to be the classic presentation, while the second type is thought to be a more atypical presentation. Phenotypes of the different disorders appear to be dependent on age, i.e. amount of iron accumulation and cognitive abilities.

Treatments
Effective disease-modifying treatments have not yet been found for any of the NBIA disorders. Current treatment is supportive and focused on improving symptoms: Dystonia is a common debilitating symptom and can be managed with oral medications, and sometimes with deep-brain electrical stimulation, therapy support for walking, eating, and manual tasks is essential. Later, in many of the diseases, slowing and stopping of movement (known as parkinsonism) can become common. Removal of iron, using medications known as iron-chelators, has been tested in clinical trial but was not definitively shown to be effective.

References

External links 

Central nervous system disorders
Extrapyramidal and movement disorders
Vitamin, coenzyme, and cofactor metabolism disorders
Basal ganglia